Bozyayla can refer to:

 Bozyayla, İliç
 Bozyayla, Sungurlu